William Edward Narleski (March 9, 1900 – July 22, 1964) was a Major League Baseball infielder. He was born in Perth Amboy, New Jersey.

In a two-season career, Narleski, who was nicknamed "Cap", was a .265 hitter (95-for-358) with 41 runs and 32 RBI in 135 games, including 25 doubles, one triple, four stolen bases, and a .326 on-base percentage without home runs.

Narleski died at the age of 64 in Laurel Springs, New Jersey.

His son, Ray Narleski, also was a major leaguer.

See also
List of second-generation MLB players

External links

Retrosheet

Boston Red Sox players
Major League Baseball shortstops
Baseball players from New Jersey
Sportspeople from Perth Amboy, New Jersey
1900 births
1964 deaths